Disco 2000 may refer to:

 "Disco 2000" (song), a song by Pulp
 Disco 2000 (band), a British pop band
 Disco 2000 (anthology), an anthology by Sarah Champion